The Sumba languages are a subgroup of the Austronesian language family, spoken on Sumba, an island in eastern Indonesia. They are closely related to the Hawu–Dhao languages.

Classification
A preliminary internal classification by Asplund (2010) recognizes three branches of the Sumba languages:

Central–East Sumbanese
East Sumbanese: Kambera (dialect cluster)
Mamboru
Central Sumbanese: Anakalangu, Wanukaka, Ponduk, Baliledu
Wejewa–Lamboya
Wejewa
Lamboya
Kodi–Gaura
Kodi
Gaura

References

Further reading

External links
 Sumba at Ethnologue (22nd ed., 2019).

 
Languages of Indonesia
Sumba–Hawu languages